= Sukdar =

Village in Maharashtra

Coordinates: 34°04′N 74°02′E

- Village
- Interactive map of Sukdar
- Country: India
- State: Maharashtra

Sukdar is a small village in Ratnagiri district, Maharashtra state in Western India. The 2011 Census of India recorded a total of 1,056 residents in the village. Sukdar's geographical area is approximately 511 hectares (1,260 acres).
